Nogarole Rocca is a comune (municipality) in the Province of Verona in the Italian region Veneto, located about  west of Venice and about  southwest of Verona.

The municipality of Nogarole Rocca contains the frazioni (subdivisions, mainly villages and hamlets) Pradelle and Bagnolo.

Nogarole Rocca borders the following municipalities: Mozzecane, Povegliano Veronese, Roverbella, Trevenzuolo, and Vigasio.

Demographic evolution

References

External links
 www.nogarolerocca.net/

Cities and towns in Veneto